Reza Shariffi is a costume designer from India. He has designed for many leading actresses in Bollywood.

He was nominated as ‘best costume designer’ for Kangana Ranaut’s costumes in the movie Tanu Weds Manu. He has designed costumes for many actors in the Indian film industry, both Hindi and regional.  He has won awards including an IIFA and Zee Cine Award for his designs in Devdas. His designs in Main Madhuri Dixit Banna Chahti Hoon were nominated for an award. He is known for designing the costumes of stars including Madhuri Dixit, Kareena Kapoor, Priyanka Chopra, Kangana Ranaut, Malaika Arora Khan, Sushmita Sen, Jacqueline Fernandez, Shraddha Kapoor, Huma Qureshi, Padma Priya, Hansika Motwani and many others.

His work ranges from the opulent and glamorous Devdas to the realistic and unglamorous Shabri.  He has over 70 films to his credit.

Shariffi has also designed for dance reality shows like Nach Baliye (four seasons), Jhalak Dikhhla Jaa (seasons 3, 4 and 5), and many others.

The ace designer found place in the 9th Annual India Leadership Conclave 2018 award as six final nominees in the category of "Indian Affairs Most Promising & Innovative Fashion Designer of the Year 2018".

Latest designs
He designed costumes for Kangana Ranaut in her first ever double role as Tanuja Trivedi and Kusum aka Datto in Tanu Weds Manu Returns. Shariffi created two very distinct looks for the characters.
Tanu Weds Manu was nominated for the costumes. Shariffi presented style icon Kangana Ranaut in a memorable desi avatar.

Shariffi also designed Ranaut's costumes for Rajjo.  Though the movie did not do well at the box office, the costumes did showcase Ranaut's character. To her credit, Ranaut carried a 300 rupee saree with as much élan as a diamante studded Ghaghara choli.

He designed the outfits Sriram Madhav Nene and Madhuri Dixit wore for their wedding reception.

Awards

Won
 2003 - International Indian Film Academy Award for Best Costume - Devdas
 2003 - National Film Award Silver Lotus for Best Costume Design - Devdas
 2003 - Zee Cine Award Zee Cine Award for Costume Design for Devdas
 Indian Telly Jury Award for Best Costumes for a TV Program for Kahin Na Kahin Koi Hai
2018 - Indian Affairs Most Promising & Innovative Fashion Designer of the Year 2018 at India Leadership Conclave 2018.

Nominations
 2004 Zee Cine Award for Best Costume Design for Main Madhuri Dixit Banna Chahti Hoon
 2012 Apsara Award Best Costume Design for Tanu Weds Manu

Costume design filmography

References

External links
Official site
 

Indian male fashion designers
Indian costume designers
1967 births
Living people
20th-century Indian designers
21st-century Indian designers
Fashion stylists